List of all the members of the Storting in the period 1862 to 1864. The list includes all those initially elected to the Storting as well as deputy representatives where available.

Rural constituencies

Smaalenenes County

Akershus county

Hedemarkens county

Christians county

Buskeruds county

Jarlsberg and Laurvigs county

Bratsberg county

Nedenæs and Robygdelagets county

Lister and Mandals county

Stavanger county

Søndre Bergenhuus County

Nordre Bergenhuus County

Romsdals County

Søndre Throndhjems County

Nordre Throndhjems County

Nordlands County

Finmarkens County

Urban constituencies

Frederikshald

Sarpsborg

Frederiksstad

Moss and Drøbak

Christiania, Hønefoss and Kongsvinger

Gjøvik, Hamar and Lillehammer

Drammen

Kongsberg

Holmestrand

Tønsberg

Laurvig and Sandefjord

Brevik

Porsgrund

Skien

Kragerø

Østerriisøer

Arendal and Grimstad

Christianssand

Flekkefjord

Stavanger

Bergen

Aalesund and Molde

Christianssund

Throndhjem and Levanger

Hammerfest, Tromsø, Vadsø and Vardø

References

Sources 
 
 Norwegian Social Science Data Service